High Level Assembly (HLA) is a language developed by Randall Hyde that allows the use of higher-level language constructs to aid both beginners and advanced assembly developers. It fully supports advanced data types and object-oriented programming. It uses a syntax loosely based on several high-level programming languages (HLLs), such as Pascal, Ada, Modula-2, and C++, to allow creating readable assembly language programs, and to allow HLL programmers to learn HLA as fast as possible.

Origins and goals 

HLA was originally conceived as a tool to teach assembly language programming at the college-university level.  The goal is to leverage students' existing programming knowledge when learning assembly language to get them up to speed as fast as possible. Most students taking an assembly language programming course have already been introduced to high-level control flow structures, such as IF, WHILE, FOR, etc. HLA allows students to immediately apply that programming knowledge to assembly language coding early in their course, allowing them to master other prerequisite subjects in assembly before learning how to code low-level forms of these control structures. The book The Art of Assembly Language Programming by Randall Hyde uses HLA for this purpose.

High vs. low-level assembler 

The HLA v2.x assembler supports the same low-level machine instructions as a regular low-level assembler, while high-end assemblers also support high-level-language-like statements, such as IF, WHILE, and so on, and fancier data declaration directives, such as structures-records, unions, and even classes.

Some examples of high-end assemblers are HLA, Microsoft Macro Assembler (MASM), and the Turbo Assembler (TASM) on the Intel x86 processor family, 

Unlike most other assembler tools, the HLA compiler includes a Standard Library with thousands of functions, procedures, and macros that can be used to create full applications with the ease of a high-level language. While assembly language libraries are not new, a language that includes a large standardized library encourages programmers to use the library code rather than simply writing their own library functions.

HLA supports all the same low-level machine instructions as other x86 assemblers. Furthermore, HLA's high-level control structures are based on the ones found in MASM and TASM, which HLL-like features predated the arrival of HLA by several years. In HLA, low-level assembly code can be written as easily as with any other assembler by simply ignoring the HLL-control constructs. In contrast to HLLs like Pascal and C(++), HLA doesn't require inline asm statements. In HLA, HLL-like features appear to provide a learning aid for beginning assembly programmers by smoothing the learning curve, with the assumption that they will discontinue the use of those statements once they master the low-level instruction set. In practice, many experienced programmers continue to use HLL-like statements in HLA, MASM, and TASM, long after mastering the low-level instruction set, but this is usually done to improve readability.

It is also possible to write high-level programs using HLA, avoiding much of the tedium of low-level assembly language programming. Some assembly language programmers reject HLA out of hand, because it allows programmers to do this.  However, supporting both high-level and low-level programming gives any language an expanded range of applicability.

Distinguishing features 

Two HLA features set it apart from other x86 assemblers: its powerful macro system (compile-time language) and the HLA Standard Library.

Macro system 

HLA's compile-time language allows extending the language with ease, even creating small domain-specific languages to help easily solve common programming problems. The macro stdout.put is a good example of a sophisticated macro that can simplify programming. Consider the following invocation of that macro:

stdout.put( "I=", i, " s=", s, " u=", u, " r=", r:10:2, nl );

The stdout.put macro processes each of the arguments to determine the argument's type and then calls an appropriate procedure in the HLA Standard library to handle the output of each of these operands.

Most assemblers provide some sort of macro ability: the advantage that HLA offers over other assemblers is that it can process macro arguments like r:10:2 using HLA's extensive compile-time string functions, and HLA's macro facilities can infer the types of variables and use that information to direct macro expansion.

HLA's macro language provides a special Context-Free macro facility. This feature allows easily writing macros that span other sections of code via a starting and terminating macro pair (along with optional intermediate macro invocations that are only available between the start–terminate macros). For example, one can write a fully recursive-nestable  SWITCH–CASE–DEFAULT–ENDSWITCH statement using this macro facility.

Because of the HLA macro facilities context-free design, these switch..case..default..endswitch statements can be nested, and the nested statements' emitted code will not conflict with the outside statements.

Compile-Time Language 

The HLA macro system is actually a subset of a larger feature known as the HLA Compile-Time Language (CTL). The HLA CTL is an interpreted language that is available in an HLA program source file. An interpreter executes HLA CTL statements during the compiling of an HLA source file; hence the name compile-time language.

The HLA CTL includes many control statements such as #IF, #WHILE, #FOR, #PRINT, an assignment statement and so on. One can also create compile-time variables and constants (including structured data types such as records and unions). The HLA CTL also provides hundreds of built-in functions (including a very rich set of string and pattern-matching functions). The HLA CTL allows programmers to create CTL programs that scan and parse strings, allowing those programmers to create embedded domain specific languages (EDSLs, also termed mini-languages). The stdout.put macro appearing earlier is an example of such an EDSL. The put macro (in the stdout namespace, hence the name stdout.put) parses its macro parameter list and emits the code that will print its operands.

Standard library 

The HLA Standard Library is an extensive set of pre-made routines and macros (like the stdout.put macro described above) that make life easier for programmers, saving them from starting from scratch every time they write a new application. Perhaps just as important, the HLA Standard Library allows programmers to write portable applications that run under Windows or Linux with nothing more than recompiling the source code. Like the C standard library for the programming language C, the HLA Standard Library allows users to abstract away low-level operating system (OS) calls, so the same set of OS application programming interfaces (APIs) can serve for all operating systems that HLA supports. While an assembly language allows making any needed OS calls, where programs use the HLA Standard Library API set, writing OS-portable programs is easy.

The HLA Standard Library provides thousands of functions, procedures, and macros. While the list changes over time, as of mid-2010 for HLA v2.12, it included functions in these categories:

 Command-line argument processing
 Array (dynamic) declaration and manipulation
 Bit manipulation
 Blob (binary large object) manipulation
 Character manipulation
 Conversions
 Character set manipulation
 Date and time functions
 Object-oriented file I/O
 Standard file I/O
 File system manipulation functions, e.g., delete, rename, change directory
 HLA-related declarations and functions
 The HLA Object Windows Library: object-oriented framework for Win32 programming
 Linked list manipulation
 Mathematical functions
 Memory allocation and management
 FreeBSD-specific APIs
 Linux-specific APIs
 MacOS-specific APIs
 Win32-specific APIs
 Text console functions
 Coroutine support
 Environment variable support
 Exception handling support
 Memory-mapped file support
 Sockets and client–server object support
 Thread and synchronization support
 Timer functions
 Pattern matching support for regular expressions and context-free languages
 Random number generators
 Remote procedure call support
 Standard error output functions
 Standard output functions
 Standard input functions
 String functions
 Table (associative) support
 Zero-terminated string functions

Design 

The HLA v2.x language system is a command-line driven tool that consists of several components, including a shell program (e.g., hla.exe under Windows), the HLA language compiler (e.g., hlaparse.exe), a low-level translator (e.g., the HLABE, or HLA Back Engine), a linker (link.exe under Windows, ld under Linux), and other tools such as a resource compiler for Windows. Versions before 2.0 relied on an external assembler back end; versions 2.x and later of HLA use the built-in HLABE as the back-end object code formatter.

The HLA shell application processes command line parameters and routes appropriate files to each of the programs that make up the HLA system. It accepts as input .hla files (HLA source files), .asm files (source files for MASM, TASM, FASM, NASM, or Gas assemblers), .obj files for input to the linker, and .rc files (for use by a resource compiler).

Source code translation 

Originally, the HLA v1.x tool compiled its source code into an intermediate source file that a back-end assembler such as MASM, TASM, flat assembler (FASM), Netwide Assembler (NASM), or GNU Assembler (Gas) would translate into the low-level object code file.  As of HLA v2.0, HLA included its own HLA Back Engine (HLABE) that provided the low-level object code translation. However, via various command-line parameters, HLA v2.x still has the ability to translate an HLA source file into a source file that is compatible with one of these other assemblers.

HLA Back Engine 

The HLA Back Engine (HLABE) is a compiler back end that translates an internal intermediate language into low-level Portable Executable (PE), Common Object File Format (COFF), Executable and Linkable Format (ELF), or Mach-O object code.  An HLABE program mostly consists of data (byte) emission statements, 32-bit relocatable address statements, x86 control-transfer instructions, and various directives. In addition to translating the byte and relocatable address statements into the low-level object code format, HLABE also handles branch-displacement optimization (picking the shortest possible form of a branch instruction).

Although the HLABE is incorporated into the HLA v2.x compiler, it is actually a separate product. It is public domain and open source (hosted on SourceForge.net).

See also 
 Comparison of assemblers

Notes

References 

 Richard Blum, Professional assembly language, Wiley, 2005, p. 42
 Randall Hyde, Write Great Code: Understanding the machine, No Starch Press, 2004, pp. 14–15 and used throughout the book
 Randall Hyde, The Art of Assembly Language, 2nd Edition, No Starch Press, 2010, used throughout the book

Further reading 
 Paul Panks (June 29, 2005), HLA: The High Level Assembly Programming Language, Linux Journal

External links 
 
 Downloads for Windows, macOS, and Linux

Assemblers
Assembly languages
Public-domain software
High-level programming languages